Sally George (born in Hull, East Riding of Yorkshire) is an English actress. Her credits include Buddha of Suburbia, Eastenders Footballers Wives, Daziel and Pascoe, Mulberry, The Bill, Casualty, Doctors, Hollyoaks, Holby City, Heartbeat, Persuasion, and Love Somehow.

She was educated at St Johns Primary, Beverley, E Yorks, St Christopher School, Letchworth, Herts, Guildhall School of Music and Drama, and Central School of Speech and Drama.

References

External links
 

Living people
English soap opera actresses
Year of birth missing (living people)
Place of birth missing (living people)
Actresses from Kingston upon Hull